Dəlləkoba (also, Dellyakoba and Dalenoba) is a village and municipality in the Masally Rayon of Azerbaijan.  It has a population of 1,331.

References 

Populated places in Masally District